Northeast Pond is a  water body located along the border between Strafford County, New Hampshire, and York County, Maine, in the northeastern United States. The lake lies in the towns of Milton, New Hampshire, and Lebanon, Maine. It connects with Milton Pond to the south, whose outlet is the Salmon Falls River. Together with Town House Pond, a northwestern arm of Milton Pond, the water bodies form a single lake network known as Milton Three Ponds.

The lake is classified as a cold- and warmwater fishery, with observed species including largemouth bass, smallmouth bass, chain pickerel, horned pout, white perch, yellow perch, and black crappie, and with rainbow and brown trout found in the deeper areas of the lakes.

See also

List of lakes in Maine
List of lakes in New Hampshire

References

Lakes of York County, Maine
Lakes of Strafford County, New Hampshire
Lakes of Maine